Gladstone is a city in Clay County, Missouri, United States and a suburb of Kansas City. The City of Gladstone is located only 10 minutes from downtown Kansas City, and 10 minutes from Kansas City International Airport. As of the 2020 census, the city population was 27,063. It is part of the Kansas City metropolitan area.

History
The Atkins-Johnson Farmhouse Property was listed on the National Register of Historic Places in 2007.

Government
Under state statute, Gladstone is a city of the third class. It has a council-manager form of government. The City Council consists of five members popularly elected every three years, with staggered terms in office. The mayor presides over council meetings, appoints members to resident boards and commissions, meets with constituents, and signs ordinances, resolutions, contracts, and agreements authorized by the council. The City Manager administers city operations and implements policies set by the City Council.

Geography
Gladstone is located at  (39.211752, -94.561687). The city is connected to nearby North Kansas City and Kansas City proper by Routes 1 and 283 as well as nearby U.S. Route 169, which sits less than one mile from the city's western border. I-29 runs near the city's southernmost tip shortly after its initial break from I-35. A handful of small subdivisions maintain independent municipalities along North Oak Trafficway, a road which is host to much of the area's shopping. The city is rectangular in shape, with the city limits generally extending from NE Englewood Road or NE 55th to NE 77th south to north, and N. Jackson Ave. to N. Broadway east to west. The city boundaries include a panhandle that goes south to NW 44th St. and from NW Briarcliff Ln. to Gladstone Waterworks Rd. from east to west. A portion of the panhandle was de-annexed by Kansas City and annexed by Gladstone in 2005 to bring the Gladstone Water Plant property within the Gladstone city limits.

Demographics

2010 census
At the 2010 census there were 25,410 people, 11,182 households, and 6,859 families living in the city. The racial makeup of the city was 85.8% White, 5.2% African American, 0.6% Native American, 1.7% Asian, 0.6% Pacific Islander, 2.6% from other races, and 3.5% from two or more races. Hispanic or Latino of any race were 7.3%.

Of the 11,182 households 27.1% had children under the age of 18 living with them, 44.5% were married couples living together, 12.3% had a female householder with no husband present, 4.6% had a male householder with no wife present, and 38.7% were non-families. 32.4% of households were one person and 12.2% were one person aged 65 or older. The average household size was 2.27 and the average family size was 2.86.

The median age was 41.7 years. 21.3% of residents were under the age of 18; 7.8% were between the ages of 18 and 24; 24.5% were from 25 to 44; 28.7% were from 45 to 64; and 17.6% were 65 or older. The gender makeup of the city was 47.9% male and 52.1% female.

2000 census
At the 2000 census there were 26,365 people, 11,484 households, and 7,384 families living in the city. The racial makeup of the city was 93.25% White, 2.05% African American, 0.52% Native American, 1.26% Asian, 0.14% Pacific Islander, 1.14% from other races, and 1.65% from two or more races. Hispanic or Latino of any race were 3.56%.

Of the 11,484 households 25.7% had children under the age of 18 living with them, 51.0% were married couples living together, 10.3% had a female householder with no husband present, and 35.7% were non-families. 29.9% of households were one person and 9.1% were one person aged 65 or older. The average household size was 2.27 and the average family size was 2.82.

The age distribution was 21.0% under the age of 18, 8.6% from 18 to 24, 28.2% from 25 to 44, 26.4% from 45 to 64, and 15.9% 65 or older. The median age was 40 years. For every 100 females, there were 92.5 males. For every 100 females age 18 and over, there were 89.3 males.

The median household income was $46,333 and the median family income  was $55,128. Males had a median income of $40,114 versus $27,429 for females. The per capita income for the city was $25,105. About 3.1% of families and 4.7% of the population were below the poverty line, including 5.6% of those under age 18 and 4.1% of those age 65 or over.

Economy

Top employers
According to the town's 2016 Comprehensive Annual Financial Report, the top employers in the city are:

Education
North Kansas City School District is the area school district. Elementary schools with sections of Gladstone in their attendance boundaries include Chapel Hill, Linden West, Meadowbrook, Oakwood Manor, Briarcliff (Kansas City), Clardy (Kansas City), and Davidson (Kansas City). The majority of Gladstone is zoned to Antioch Middle School in Gladstone and Oak Park High School in Kansas City. Portions south of NW Englewood Road are zoned to Northgate Middle School in Kansas City and North Kansas City High School in North Kansas City.

Gladstone has a public library, a branch of the Mid-Continent Public Library.

Notable people
 Melana Scantlin, Miss Missouri USA 2002 and Average Joe star
 Jerry Nolte, artist, representative to the Missouri state legislature, and Clay County Presiding Commissioner
 Jason Johnson, former Indianapolis Colts player

References

External links
 City of Gladstone

Cities in Clay County, Missouri
Cities in Kansas City metropolitan area
Populated places established in 1952
1952 establishments in Missouri
Cities in Missouri